The 1988 United States men's Olympic basketball team represented the United States at the 1988 Summer Olympics in Seoul, South Korea. The team's head coach was John Thompson, of Georgetown University. Team USA won the tournament's bronze medal, their lowest finish to that point in any Olympic basketball tournament.

This was the last Olympic basketball tournament where NBA players were not allowed to participate; FIBA instituted a rule change in 1989 that lifted that restriction, leading to the dominance of 1992's Dream Team.

Roster

Team staff members

Head Coach: John Thompson of Georgetown University
Assistant coach: George Raveling of the University of Southern California
Assistant coach: Mary Fenlon of Georgetown University
Manager: Bill Stein of St. Peter's College, in New Jersey
Team physician: James Hill of Chicago, Illinois
Athletic trainer: Troy Young of Arizona State University

Results
 beat , 97–53
 beat , 76–70
 beat , 102–87
 beat  (PRC), 108–57
 beat , 102–35
 beat , 94–57
 beat , 82–76
 beat , 78–49

The American team did not reach the gold-medal game for the first time in its history. However, the team rebounded, and beat Australia in the bronze-medal game 78–49.

Final standings
1.  (7–1)
2.  (6–2)
3.  (7–1)
4.  (4–4)
5.  (5–3)
6.  (3–5)
7.  (4–4)
8.  (4–4)
9.  (2–5)
10.  (2–5)
11.  (2–5)
12.  (0–7)

See also
Basketball at the 1988 Summer Olympics

References

External links
USA Basketball, official site

United States at the Olympic men's basketball tournament
United States
Olympics